The following outline is provided as an overview of and topical guide to the U.S. state of New Jersey:

New Jersey – U.S. state on the East coast of the United States, and the most densely populated state in the U.S.  It was one of the original Thirteen Colonies that declared their independence in the American Revolution and formed the United States of America.  It was named after the largest of the British Channel Islands, Jersey.

General reference 

 Names
 Common name: New Jersey
 Official name: State of New Jersey
 Abbreviations and name codes
 Postal symbol:  NJ
 ISO 3166-2 code:  US-NJ
 Internet second-level domain:  .nj.us
 Nicknames
Garden State (currently used on license plates)
The Crossroads of the Revolution (previously used on license plates)
 The Tomato State
 Adjectival: New Jersey
 Demonyms
 New Jerseyan
 New Jerseyite

Geography of New Jersey 

Geography of New Jersey
 New Jersey is: a U.S. state, a federal state of the United States of America
 Location
 Northern hemisphere
 Western hemisphere
 Americas
 North America
 Anglo America
 Northern America
 United States of America
 Contiguous United States
 Eastern United States
 East Coast of the United States
 Northeastern United States
 Northeast megalopolis
 Mid-Atlantic states
 Population of New Jersey: 8,791,894  (2010 U.S. Census)
 Area of New Jersey:
 Atlas of New Jersey

Places in New Jersey 
 List of municipalities in New Jersey
 Historic places in New Jersey
 Ghost towns in New Jersey
 National Historic Landmarks in New Jersey
 National Register of Historic Places listings in New Jersey
 Bridges on the National Register of Historic Places in New Jersey
 National Natural Landmarks in New Jersey
 National parks in New Jersey
 State parks in New Jersey

Environment of New Jersey 

 Climate of New Jersey
 Geology of New Jersey
 Protected areas in New Jersey
 State forests of New Jersey
 Superfund sites in New Jersey
 Wildlife of New Jersey
 Fauna of New Jersey
 Birds of New Jersey
 Reptiles
 Snakes of New Jersey

Natural geographic features of New Jersey 

 Islands of New Jersey
 Lakes of New Jersey
 Mountains of New Jersey
 Rivers of New Jersey

Regions of New Jersey 

 Central New Jersey, or Central Jersey
 Northern New Jersey, or North Jersey
 Northeastern New Jersey, or the Gateway Region
 Northwestern New Jersey, or the Skylands Region
 South Jersey
 Southeastern New Jersey, or the Southern Shore Region and Greater Atlantic City
 Southwestern New Jersey, or the Delaware Valley
 Eastern New Jersey, or the Jersey Shore
 Western New Jersey, or Trenton, Mercer County

Administrative divisions of New Jersey 

 The 21 Counties of the State of New Jersey
 Municipalities in New Jersey
 Cities in New Jersey
 State capital of New Jersey:
 City nicknames in New Jersey

Demography of New Jersey 

Demographics of New Jersey

Government and politics of New Jersey 

Politics of New Jersey
 Form of government: U.S. state government
 United States congressional delegations from New Jersey
 New Jersey State Capitol
 Elections in New Jersey
 Electoral reform in New Jersey
 Political party strength in New Jersey

Branches of the government of New Jersey 

Government of New Jersey

Executive branch of the government of New Jersey 
 Governor of New Jersey
 Lieutenant Governor of New Jersey
 Secretary of State of New Jersey
 New Jersey Attorney General
 State departments
 New Jersey Department of Agriculture
 New Jersey Department of Banking and Insurance
 New Jersey Department of Children and Families
 New Jersey Department of Community Affairs
 New Jersey Department of Corrections
 New Jersey Department of Education
 New Jersey Department of Environmental Protection
 New Jersey Department of Health and Senior Services
 New Jersey Department of Human Services
 New Jersey Department of Labor and Workforce Development
 New Jersey Department of Law and Public Safety
 New Jersey Department of Military and Veterans Affairs
 New Jersey Department of State
 New Jersey Department of Transportation
 New Jersey Department of the Treasury

Legislative branch of the government of New Jersey 

 New Jersey Legislature (bicameral)
 Upper house: New Jersey Senate
 Lower house: New Jersey General Assembly

Judicial branch of the government of New Jersey 

Courts of New Jersey
 Supreme Court of New Jersey

Law and order in New Jersey 

Law of New Jersey
 Cannabis in New Jersey
 Capital punishment in New Jersey
 Individuals executed in New Jersey
 Constitution of New Jersey
 Crime in New Jersey
 Gun laws in New Jersey
 Law enforcement in New Jersey
 Law enforcement agencies in New Jersey
 New Jersey State Police
 State Prisons in New Jersey
 Same-sex marriage in New Jersey
 Taxation in New Jersey

Military in New Jersey 

 New Jersey Air National Guard
 New Jersey Army National Guard

Local government in New Jersey 

Local government in New Jersey

History of New Jersey 

History of New Jersey

History of New Jersey, by period 
 Prehistory of New Jersey
Netherlands colony of Nieuw-Nederland, 1624–1664
Bergen, New Netherland
Swedish colony of Nya Sverige, 1638–1655
English Province of New-York, (1664)
English Province of New-Jersey, 1664–1673
Third Anglo-Dutch War, 1672–1674
Netherlands military government of Nieuw-Nederland, 1673–1674
Treaty of Westminster of 1674
English Province of East Jersey 1674–1688
English Province of West Jersey 1674–1688
English Dominion of New-England in America, 1688–1689
English Province of East Jersey 1689–1702
English Province of West Jersey 1689–1702
English Province of New-Jersey 1702–1707
British Province of New-Jersey, 1707–1776
King George's War, 1740–1748
Treaty of Aix-la-Chapelle of 1748
French and Indian War, 1754–1763
Treaty of Paris of 1763
American Revolutionary War, April 19, 1775 – September 3, 1783
New York and New Jersey campaign, July 3, 1776 – July 26, 1777
Battle of Trenton, December 26, 1776
United States Declaration of Independence, July 4, 1776
Treaty of Paris, September 3, 1783
State of New Jersey since 1776
Eleventh state to ratify the Articles of Confederation and Perpetual Union, signed November 26, 1778
Third State to ratify the Constitution of the United States of America on December 18, 1787
 New Jersey in the 19th century
War of 1812, June 18, 1812 – March 23, 1815
Treaty of Ghent, December 24, 1814
American Civil War, April 12, 1861 – May 13, 1865
New Jersey in the American Civil War
Grover Cleveland becomes 22nd President of the United States on March 4, 1885
Grover Cleveland also becomes 24th President of the United States on March 4, 1893
 New Jersey in the 20th century
Woodrow Wilson becomes 28th President of the United States on March 4, 1913
 New Jersey in the 21st century

History of New Jersey, by region 
 By city
 History of Newark, New Jersey

History of New Jersey, by subject 
 History of Ku Klux Klan in New Jersey
 History of the New Jersey State Constitution
 History of slavery in New Jersey
 History of transportation in New Jersey
 History of state highways in New Jersey (pre-1927)

Culture of New Jersey

Culture of New Jersey
 Cuisine of New Jersey
List of people from New Jersey
Halls of fame in New Jersey
 Museums in New Jersey
 Religion in New Jersey
Baptist Convention of Pennsylvania/South Jersey
Church of the Brethren (Atlantic Northeast District)
 Episcopal Diocese of New Jersey
Episcopal Diocese of Newark
New Jersey District (LCMS) (Lutheran Church – Missouri Synod)
New Jersey Synod (ELCA) (Evangelical Lutheran Church in America)
Orthodox Church in America Diocese of New York and New Jersey
Roman Catholic Archdiocese of Newark
Roman Catholic Diocese of Camden
Roman Catholic Diocese of Metuchen
Roman Catholic Diocese of Paterson
Roman Catholic Diocese of Trenton
Byzantine Catholic Eparchy of Passaic
Syrian Catholic Eparchy of Our Lady of Deliverance of Newark
 Scouting in New Jersey
 State symbols of New Jersey
 Flag of the State of New Jersey 
 Great Seal of the State of New Jersey

The arts in New Jersey 
 Music of New Jersey

Economy and infrastructure of New Jersey 

Economy of New Jersey
 Communications in New Jersey
 Newspapers in New Jersey
 Radio stations in New Jersey
 Television stations in New Jersey
 Energy in New Jersey
 Power stations in New Jersey
 Solar power in New Jersey
 Wind power in New Jersey
 Health care in New Jersey
 Hospitals in New Jersey
 Transportation in New Jersey
 Airports in New Jersey
 List of New Jersey railroads
 Roads in New Jersey
 State highways in New Jersey

Education in New Jersey 

Education in New Jersey
 Schools in New Jersey
 School districts in New Jersey
 High schools in New Jersey
 Colleges and universities in New Jersey
 Rutgers, The State University of New Jersey
 Princeton University

See also
Topic overview:
New Jersey

Index of New Jersey-related articles

References

External links 

New Jersey
New Jersey